Sassi Punnu may refer to:
 Sassui Punnhun, a love story from Sindi and Balochi folklore
 Sassi Punnu (1958 film), a 1958 Pakistani film in the Sindhi language
 Sassi Punnu (1983 film), a 1983 Indian Punjabi film
 Sassi Punno, a 2004 Urdu film from Pakistan